During the 1995–96 season, Tottenham Hotspur participated in the FA Premier League.

Season summary
The sale of key players Jürgen Klinsmann, Gheorghe Popescu and Nick Barmby weakened Tottenham's resources for 1995–96, and manager Gerry Francis was faced with taunts of "what a waste of money" from shocked supporters when he paid a club record £4.5million for Crystal Palace striker Chris Armstrong.

But Armstrong quickly formed an effective strikeforce with Teddy Sheringham, and an eighth-place finish in the final table was only one place lower than last season's final position - though it was once again not quite enough for a UEFA Cup place.

Perhaps the best moment of the season came on New Year's Day when Spurs triumphed 4–1 at home to Manchester United, dealing a serious blow to the visiting side's title hopes and boosting their own hopes of qualifying for the UEFA Cup as they muscled in on the top five. While Spurs failed to live up to the promise that the game delivered, the losing side lost only one more league game all season and won the league title which had looked an impossible job a few short months earlier.

Early in the season, Tottenham (and London rivals Wimbledon) were informed that they would be banned from European competition by UEFA for the 1996–97 season, for fielding weakened teams in the pre-season UEFA Intertoto Cup. The ban was lifted on appeal.

Final league table

Results
Tottenham Hotspur's score comes first

Legend

FA Premier League

FA Cup

League Cup

UEFA Intertoto Cup

Note: Home games in the Intertoto Cup were played at the Goldstone Ground due to unavailability of White Hart Lane

Squad
Squad at end of season

Left club during season

Intertoto Cup squad
Tottenham used a squad of loan players and reserve team players while competing in the Intertoto Cup.

Reserve squad

Transfers

In

Out

Transfers in:  £10,200,000
Transfers out:  £11,647,000
Total spending:  £1,447,420

Statistics

Appearances and goals

|-
! colspan=14 style=background:#dcdcdc; text-align:center| Goalkeepers

|-
! colspan=14 style=background:#dcdcdc; text-align:center| Defenders

|-
! colspan=14 style=background:#dcdcdc; text-align:center| Midfielders

|-
! colspan=14 style=background:#dcdcdc; text-align:center| Forwards

|-
! colspan=14 style=background:#dcdcdc; text-align:center| Players transferred out during the season

Goal scorers 

The list is sorted by shirt number when total goals are equal.

Clean sheets

References

Tottenham Hotspur
Tottenham Hotspur F.C. seasons